Imbituba is a port and coastal town in the southern Brazil state of Santa Catarina. As of 2020, it has an estimated population of 45,286. It is also home to a population of Portuguese, Italian, and German descent, and it is about one hour drive from Florianópolis, the capital of Santa Catarina.

Whaling
Up until the mid‑20th century Imbituba was an important home of Brazilian whalers since 1796, when the southernmost whaling station in Brazil was established there to prey on right whales. Today, the rebuilt whaling station is a historic site and museum managed by the internationally acclaimed Brazilian Right Whale Project (Projeto Baleia Franca), based in nearby Itapirubá at the National Right Whale Conservation Center and has worked for the recovery of this endangered whale species since 1982. Right whales visit Imbituba, Itapirubá and Ibiraquera/Ribanceira beaches in winter and spring to mate, give birth and nurse their calves. Thanks to the work of the Right Whale Project, this region has become a federal  Environmental Protection Area currently under implementation.

Infrastructure
The Port of Imbituba is currently the only privately operated port in Brazil. As part of Brazil's plan to modernize its port infrastructure, it plans to invest in the Port of Imbituba and transform it into one of Brazil's most prominent ports such as the Port of Santos. As part of this initiative, the government also plans on upgrading routes that lead to the port itself such as roads and railroads, as well as integrating the various transport modes. The Santa Catarina investments put the port as first priority of the city, which some see as unfortunate as tourism should also be given adequate priority due to the regional potential like ecotourism and historical sites. Imbituba is now one of the homes for WCT worldwide surfing championships.

Imbituba has stocks in Brazil market Bovespa; the codes of the stocks are imbi4 and imbi3.

People
Jorginho, Italian-Brazilian footballer

References

Populated coastal places in Santa Catarina (state)
Whaling stations
Whaling in Brazil
Municipalities in Santa Catarina (state)